Massachusetts's 3rd congressional district is located in northeastern and central Massachusetts.

Massachusetts congressional redistricting after the 2010 census has greatly changed the borders of this congressional district, largely dividing it between the new 2nd and 4th districts, with the new 3rd district covering only a few towns from the old district. Effective with the elections of 2012, Worcester is in the new 2nd district and the new 3rd district is similar to the old 5th district, largely covering the Merrimack valley including Lowell, Lawrence and Haverhill.

The district is represented by Democrat Lori Trahan.

Cities and towns in the district 

In Essex County: Precincts 2 through 7 and Precinct 9 in Andover, Haverhill, Lawrence, and Methuen.

In Middlesex County: Acton, Ashby, Ayer, Boxborough, Carlisle, Chelmsford, Concord, Dracut, Dunstable, Groton, Hudson, Littleton, Lowell, Marlborough, Maynard, Pepperell, Shirley, Stow, Townsend, Tyngsborough, Westford, and Precinct 1 in Sudbury.

In Worcester County: Ashburnham, Berlin, Bolton, Clinton, Fitchburg, Gardner, Harvard, Lancaster, Lunenburg, Westminster, and Precincts 1A, 2 and 3 in Winchendon.

Cities and towns in the district 2003–2013
In Bristol County: Attleboro, Fall River (Wards 1–3; Ward 4, Precincts A and B; Ward 5, Precincts A and B; Ward 6, Precincts B and C; and Ward 8, Precinct D), North Attleborough, Rehoboth, Seekonk, Somerset, Swansea.

In Middlesex County: Ashland, Holliston, Hopkinton, Marlborough.

In Norfolk County: Franklin, Medway, Plainville, Wrentham.

In Worcester County: Auburn, Boylston, Clinton, Holden, Northborough, Paxton, Princeton, Rutland, Shrewsbury, Southborough, West Boylston, Westborough, Worcester.

Recent election results from presidential races

Maps

List of members representing the district

Recent election results

2002

2004

2006

2008

2010

2012

2014

2016

2018

2020

Notes

References

 Congressional Biographical Directory of the United States 1774–present
 National atlas congressional maps

External links

2004 election results, via CNN.com
2006 election results, via CNN.com

Further reading
 
 
 

03
Government of Bristol County, Massachusetts
Government of Middlesex County, Massachusetts
Government of Norfolk County, Massachusetts
Government in Worcester County, Massachusetts
Constituencies established in 1789
1789 establishments in Massachusetts